Linda Mūrniece (née Linda Mūrniece; born 28 January 1970 in Dobele) is a Latvian politician and journalist. She is a member of Unity, and has served as both the Minister for the Interior as well as the Minister for Defence of Latvia.

In 2002 Mūrniece was elected as a member of the eighth Saeima. She has been the Secretary of Parliament for both the Ministry for the Interior and the Ministry of Defence. After the resignation of Einars Repše as the Minister for Defence, Mūrniece took the office on 5 January 2006 and served until 7 April 2006 when the New Era Party resigned from the government.

Mūrniece was also elected as a member of the ninth Saeima in 2006. On 12 March 2009 Mūrniece became the Minister for the Interior. After the October 2010 election Mūrniece continued her work as the Minister. In early 2011, after a burglary by four policeman in Jēkabpils during which another policeman was shot, Mūrniece resigned.

She was married to Unity member of the Saeima Hosams Abu Meri.

References

1970 births
Living people
People from Dobele
New Era Party politicians
New Unity politicians
Ministers of Defence of Latvia
Ministers of the Interior of Latvia
Deputies of the 8th Saeima
Deputies of the 9th Saeima
Deputies of the 10th Saeima
Women deputies of the Saeima
Female defence ministers
Women government ministers of Latvia
Female interior ministers
University of Latvia alumni
21st-century Latvian women politicians